KKUP (91.5 FM) is a community radio station broadcasting a Variety format.  Licensed to Cupertino, California, it serves the San Jose section of the San Francisco Bay Area.  The station is currently owned by the Assurance Science Foundation, Inc. KKUP also has a booster, KKUP-FM1, licensed to Los Gatos, California.

KKUP began broadcasting in May 1972. In the 1970s, one of the engineers at the station was John Draper, otherwise known as "Captain Crunch" the phone phreak.

See also
List of community radio stations in the United States

References

External links
KKUP official website

KUP
Community radio stations in the United States
Radio stations established in 1991
1991 establishments in California
Mass media in San Jose, California